The M18 Colored Smoke Grenade is a US Army grenade used as a ground-to-ground or ground-to-air signaling device, a target or landing zone marking device, or a screening device for unit maneuvering.

History
The M18 was developed in 1942 during World War II and was completed in November of that year. It was designed to replace the M16 smoke grenade, which did not burn as long or as vividly. It was designated standard issue in the fall of 1943. Both were produced at the same time as the M16 production lines were already setup when the M18 was adopted. The M16 was available in red, orange, yellow, green, blue, violet, and black. The M18 initially were going to be produced in the same colors, including white, but it was decided to limit it to four colors (red, yellow, green and violet) for simplicity. The M16 was declared limited standard in 1944 but was still available when it was declared obsolete in the early 1990s.

The violet-colored smoke grenade was used in-theater because of its vivid color; previously it was only used in the United States for training. Its smoke was more toxic than the other color mixtures and was removed from the inventory after the end of the Cold War in the 1990s.

The green-colored smoke grenade was still used in Southeast Asia because the jungle undergrowth was a different color and would still contrast with it. It was discovered that the green smoke drove away swarming bees.

When a ground element popped smoke to identify its location to aircraft, the aircraft was not told the color, but told to identify the color they saw. This prevented the VC/NVA if monitoring the frequency from popping smoke of the same color to confuse the aircraft. For additional security the colors were sometimes identified as cherry (red), lime (green), lemon or banana (yellow), or grape (violet).

Potential hazard
With both the white AN-M8 and colored M18 there is a danger of starting a fire if it is used in a dry area. Expended smoke grenade canisters remain hot for some time after burning out and should not be picked up bare-handed.

The smoke is harmful if it is inhaled for prolonged periods; new smoke mixtures are under development that are less toxic. In enclosed spaces the smoke displaces oxygen and can cause respiratory or oxygen deprivation.

Media Use
The use of violet-colored M18 Smoke Grenades can be seen during the "Purple Haze" scene, in the film Apocalypse Now (1979).

See also

United States hand grenades

References

Smoke grenades
Hand grenades of the United States